The Summit is a residential skyscraper located in upper Mid-Levels, Hong Kong. Construction of the building began in 1999 and it opened in 2001. Highcliff, another tall skyscraper, stands right next to this building.

Due to the visual effect of its proximity to Highcliff, another very thin and tall building, the two together are often referred to as "The Chopsticks".  These two buildings highlight the characters of pencil-thin towers that are highly concentrated in Hong Kong.

See also
List of tallest buildings in Hong Kong

References

External links

Residential buildings completed in 2001
Residential skyscrapers in Hong Kong
Pencil towers in Hong Kong